Jon Shenk is an American documentary film producer and director. He is the co-founder of Actual Films, the production company of the documentaries Athlete A, An Inconvenient Sequel, Audrie & Daisy, 3.5 Minutes, The Island President, Lost Boys of Sudan and The Rape of Europa.

Career 
Shenk has directed, photographed and produced numerous documentary feature films and shorts. Shenk co-directed and photographed Athlete A and An Inconvenient Sequel: Truth to Power. In 2016, Shenk co-directed and photographed the film Audrie & Daisy, which premiered at the 2016 Sundance Film Festival where it was acquired by Netflix. Shenk is also the director and photographer of The Island President, a documentary about the first democratically elected president of the Maldives, Mohamed Nasheed.

Filmography 
Directed Features

 Athlete A (2020)
 Splash (2019, documentary short) 
 An Inconvenient Sequel: Truth to Power (2017)
 Audrie & Daisy (2016)
 The Island President (2011)
 Lost Boys of Sudan (2003)
 The Beginning: Making 'Episode I' (2001)

Producing Credits

 Freedom to Dream (2020, documentary short, executive producer)
 Jaiquan's Sketch (2019, documentary short, executive producer)
 Cooking for Life (2019, documentary short, executive producer)
 Sounds of Life (2019, documentary short, executive producer)
 Be Like Water (2019, documentary short, executive producer)
 Drawn to the Mat (2019, documentary short, executive producer)
 Just Breathe (2019, documentary short, executive producer)
 Nature: No App Required (2019, documentary short, executive producer)
 Splash (2019, documentary short, executive producer)
 The Seer and the Unseen (2019, executive producer)
 Melting Ice (2017, documentary short, co-producer)
 Exposé: America's Investigative Reports (2007, series, producer, 1 episode)
 Blame Somebody Else
 The Rape of Europa (2006, producer)
 P.O.V. (2004, series, producer, 1 episode)
 Lost Boys of Sudan
 Lost Boys of Sudan (2003, producer)
 From Puppets to Pixels: Digital Characters in 'Episode II' (2002, producer)

Cinematographer Credits

 Freedom to Dream (2020, documentary short)
 Athlete A (2020)
 Sounds of Life (2019, documentary short)
 RUTH - Justice Ginsburg in her own Words (2019)
 Just Breathe (2019, documentary short)
 An Inconvenient Sequel: Truth to Power (2017)
 Audrie & Daisy (2016, director of photography)
 A Kind of Order (2013)
 American Jerusalem: Jews and the Making of San Francisco (2013)
 The Revolutionary Optimists (2013)
 The Battle of Amfar (2013, documentary short)
 Eames: The Architect & The Painter (2011)
 The Island President (2011)
 The Burning Wigs of Sedition (2010, documentary short)
 National Geographic Explorer (2005-2010, series, 4 episodes)
 How Man Tamed the Wild (2010)
 Journey to an Alien Moon (2010)
 Nazi Mystery: Twins from Brazil (2009)
 Pyramids of Fire (2005)
 Through the Wormhole (2010, series, 1 episode) 
 Are We Alone? 
 Nourish: Food + Community (2009, documentary short)
 P.O.V. (2009, series, 1 episode)
 New Muslim Cool 
 Exposé: America's Investigative Reports (2009, series, 1 episode)
 The People's Sheriff 
 Smile Pinki (2008, documentary short)
 Undercover History (2007, series, 1 episode)
 J. Edgar Hoover 
 The Days and the Hours (2006, documentary short)
 Frontline (2006, series, 1 episode)
 A Hidden Life
 The Rape of Europa (2006)
 Secrets of Revelation (2006)
 The Human Behavior Experiments (2006)
 The New Heroes (2005, series, 1 episode)
 Power of Enterprise 
 Lost Boys of Sudan (2003)
 Nova (2000, series, 1 episode)
 Runaway Universe (2000)
 Frozen Fisherman (1999)
 Kofi Annan: Eye of the Storm (1998)

Awards 

 2003 International Documentary Association Award Nominee, Feature Documentary, Lost Boys of Sudan (2003), shared with Megan Mylan
 2004 Film Independent Spirit Award Winner, Truer Than Fiction, Lost Boys of Sudan (2003), shared with Megan Mylan
 2005 News & Documentary Emmy Award Nominee, Outstanding Continuing Coverage of a News Story - Long Form, P.O.V. (1988), Lost Boys of Sudan (2003), shared with Sally Jo Fifer (executive producer), Cara Mertes (executive producer), Frances Reid (executive producer), Megan Mylan (producer)
 2005 News & Documentary Emmy Award Nominee, Outstanding Individual Achievement in a Craft: Cinematography, P.O.V. (1988), Lost Boys of Sudan (2003)
 2006 News & Documentary Emmy Award Nominee, Outstanding Individual Achievement in a Craft: Cinematography, The New Heroes (2005), shared with Banks Tarver (cinematographer) and Mitch Wilson (cinematographer)
 2007 News & Documentary Emmy Award Winner, Outstanding Feature Story in a News Magazine, AIR: America's Investigative Reports (2006), shared with Tom Casciato (executive producer), Scott Davis (senior producer), Peter Nicks (co-producer), Stephen Segaller (executive in charge)
 2011 DOC NYC Nominee, Viewfinders Grand Jury Prize, The Island President (2011)
 2011 Toronto International Film Festival Award Winner, People's Choice Award Documentary, The Island President (2011)
 2012 International Documentary Association Award Winner, Pare Lorentz Award, The Island President (2011), shared with Jon Else (executive producer), Bonni Cohen (producer), Richard Berge (producer)
 2016 Sundance Film Festival Nominee, Grand Jury Prize, Audrie & Daisy (2016), shared with Bonni Cohen
 2017 Cannes Film Festival Nominee, Golden Eye, An Inconvenient Sequel: Truth to Power (2017), shared with Bonni Cohen
 2017 San Sebastián International Film Festival Award Winner, Greenpeace Lurra Award, An Inconvenient Sequel: Truth to Power (2017), shared with Bonni Cohen
 2018 British Academy of Film and Television Arts Nominee, Best Documentary, An Inconvenient Sequel: Truth to Power (2017), shared with Bonni Cohen
 2020 Critics' Choice Documentary Award Nominee, Best Director, Athlete A (2020), shared with Bonni Cohen

References

Living people
Year of birth missing (living people)